Mine Protected Vehicle may refer to:

 Armoured personnel carrier
 Medium Mine Protected Vehicle
 Mahindra Mine Protected Vehicle (MPV-I)
 MRAP (Mine-Resistant Ambush Protected)

See also
 V-hull
 Land mine